A gel blaster, also known as a gel gun, gel shooter, gel marker, hydro marker, hydro blaster, water bead blaster or gelsoft, is a toy gun similar in design to airsoft guns, but the projectiles they shoot are  superabsorbent polymer water beads (most commonly sodium polyacrylate, colloquially called water beads, hydrogel balls, gel balls, water bullets or simply gels), which are often sold commercially as moisture retainers for gardening and pot/vase floriculture.

Gel blasters are often played in CQB-style shooting skirmishes similar to paintball by squads or local clubs of enthusiasts often referred to as "gelballers", but follow an airsoft-like honor-based gameplay umpiring system.  MilSim games involving players wearing camouflage and dump pouches are very popular, while "SpeedGel" players are more casual with team jerseys and often wear paintball masks.  In addition to safety gear such as eye protections, the sport is heavily regulated on the field and players must adhere to safety rules.

Design 

The general design of gel blasters is very similar to airsoft guns, usually comprising a coil spring-loaded piston air pump, with a T-piece ahead of the pump outlet to feed gel beads.  The spring-piston pump is either manually cocked (like a spring-piston gun) or more commonly driven by an electric motor-gearbox assembly powered by batteries (mostly identical to airsoft automatic electric guns (AEG)).  Whilst the pressure output is identical to most airsoft guns via the use of compressed air, the uneven spherical shape, less weight and greater size of the projectile results in lower muzzle velocity than most airsoft guns.   This nature of the gel ball external and terminal ballistics make them much safer to play with (although protective eyewear is still recommended) and very unlikely to cause any property damage.   The gel beads are also very cheap, easily transported in packets and only require soaking in water for a few hours prior to playing.  Another feature is the ease of cleaning, since the gel beads are made up of water in over 98% of mass and volume, and will break upon impact and simply dehydrate into tiny biodegradable slush powder fragments afterwards.

Originally, the early gel blaster designs used paintball-style top-mounted hoppers (often disguised as fake optical sights) that relied on gravity to load the gel beads when shooting, because the water beads were typically too fragile to withstand even the pressure exerted by a follower spring.  However, in late 2016, bottom-mounted magazines with inbuilt motors were introduced, which draw power from the main batteries (via contact points at the top) to drive a cogwheel that gently pushed the beads up a feeding tube.  This gave a lot more realism than previously and triggered a huge surge in the popularity and market of gel blasters.  The recent proliferation of more hardy gel beads on the market has also introduced magazines using the traditional spring follower.

Gas blowback blasters 
In early 2020, "Kublai P1", a gas-powered version modelled after the Glock pistol, started to appear on the market.  The P1 is essentially the same in design to gas blowback airsoft pistols, and uses refrigerant gas (such as R-134a or HFC-152a) or propane to charge a gas canister built within a spring-follower magazine.  The original version is fully polymer, but an upgraded version with metal slide and barrel is available for sale by retailers in Australia.  Numerous other manufacturers have followed suit, releasing their own brands of gas blowback pistols.

Accessories 
There are a variety of products made and produced to complement gel blasters, which feeds from ordinary gel ball ammunition.

Grenades 
Gel grenades are essentially a bottle with an internal spring mechanism.  When the safety clip is pulled and the lever is relaxed, a sear mechanism is released and allows three trapdoor-like hatches on the external shell to spread open, followed by the release of three spring-loaded hinged flaps underneath that "flick out" out any gel beads stored within the cavity between the hatches and the flaps, causing a "shower" of gel beads in all directions.  The sear can be designed to release in a delayed fashion, or in response to vibrations caused by impacts.

Anti-personnel mine 
Gel mines are essentially plastic clamshell containers shaped like the M18 Claymore, with a pair of spring-loaded internal hinged flaps connected end-to-end by a looping piece of canvas.  When the mine is loaded, the two flaps are folded down and trapped by the locked-shut clamshell enclosure, and gel beads are stored into the space within the canvas loop via a small feeding window on the front enclosure.  The locking mechanism of the clamshell enclosure can be released manually by a tripwire, or by a remote control.  When released, the clamshell enclosure opens up, allowing the two spring flaps to flip out like a french door, stretching and flattening the canvas between them, which will launch out all the stored gel beads towards the front direction.

Launchers 
In March 2020, a gel blaster version of the M203 grenade launcher was introduced to the Chinese market by MAX SUN, which is designed to mount on the underside of another gel blaster's handguard via a Picatinny rail interface.  It uses a rechargeable aluminium gas canister shaped like a 40 mm grenade, whose cap portion has six tubular holes each capable of holding numerous 7mm gel balls.  Instead of actually launching the "grenade", the launcher actually functions like a shotgun.  When the trigger is pulled, the launcher's spring-loaded hammer strikes a valve at the center of the "grenade" base and allows the canister's stored gas to be released through its cap holes, propelling and spraying out a shower of gel balls towards the target.

Another Chinese company called LDT also introduced a similar "grenade launcher" in the shape of the Milkor MGL, which uses a mainspring-driven revolver-like mechanism that needs to be manually wound before use, and can hold a total of six canisters for repeated discharges.

Safety concerns 
Safety concerns have been expressed about children using gel blasters.  Between December 2018 and May 2019, eight children (ranging in age from four to 14 years) presented at the Queensland Children's Hospital emergency department with eye injuries caused by gel-blaster guns. In 2019 a 14-year-old presented at hospital with loss of eyesight, pain and vomiting after being struck in the eye by a gel pellet at 10 meters.

Legality 
First introduced in China as an airsoft substitute (as airsoft has been effectively banned in the Mainland since 2008) and as a better alternative to foam dart guns, gel blasters have become increasingly popular in regions with airsoft-unfriendly laws such as Malaysia, Vietnam, and particularly Australia, where they quickly gained a massive enthusiast following in states like Queensland and South Australia.

Australia 
Gel blasters have been involved in several criminal incidents.  In May 2020, a man was arrested for allegedly perpetrating drive-by attacks on pedestrians with gel blasters.  There have been numerous reports in QLD and SA of persons being charged and arrested for misuse of gel blasters.

As the gel beads (which are commonly sold in gardening and household hardware stores) are not legally regarded as ammunitions, gel blasters are classified as toys by the ACCC ASN/NZ 8124 in Australia and used to be legal for sale, but some toy importers/merchants, such as Brad Towner from Armored Heaven in New South Wales and Peter Clarke from Tactical Edge in Queensland, have been subjected to shipment seizures by the Australian Border Force and prosecuted for "firearm offences" but had the lawsuits ruled in their favor. There were also incidents of NSW Police border patrol ambushing and arresting people who drove interstate to purchase gel blasters from Queensland.

On October 8, 2020, the South Australia Police (SAPOL) announced that gel blasters would be officially declared as a regulated imitation firearm, and subjected to the same sale and possession licensing as paintball markers under the Firearms Act 2015 and Firearms Regulations 2017. People owning gel blasters are required to obtain a Category A firearm licence and registration within a six-month amnesty period (from October 8, 2020, to April 7, 2021), or hand any unauthorised items into a police station or a participating firearms dealer.  Calls to compensate businesses crippled by the new regulations have been rejected by the State Government.  On October 14, SAPOL made the first gel blaster-related arrest of a 26-year-old man. The new regulation has been met with protests from enthusiasts, but South Australia's paintball community has applauded the crackdown.  This crackdown leaves Queensland as the only state in Australia where gel blasters are able to be possessed without a licence, though laws were passed in July 2020 categorising gel blasters as restricted items which means they must be stored in a locked container and cannot be possessed without a reasonable excuse.

In late 2020, a court case was filed against SAPOL seeking to challenge the ban on gel blasters.  Chris Sinclair, spokesman for the Gel Blaster Association of Australia was quoted as saying he was confident these court proceedings would be successful.  Exact details and the outcome of the court case is at this point unknown however a GoFundMe campaign raised over $22,870 towards fees for a "class action against SAPOL".

From July 3, 2021, the Western Australian Government banned gel blasters citing similarity to real weapons and legitimate safety concerns.  After July 3, 2021, anyone found with a gel blaster in Western Australia could face jail time and up to a $36,000 fine.  One of the precipitating events for the ban was a 4-hour siege at a pharmacy in Applecross, a suburb of Perth, where the man at the centre of the siege was wielding a gel blaster.  After the formal ban of gel blasters in Western Australia, Queensland remains the last state where gel blasters are legal in Australia.

Similarly, DJI's popular remote controlled toy ground drone, the RoboMaster S1, which was introduced into the international market in mid-2019, was almost banned from import into Australia because it had a blaster gun for competitive tag matches, and as of November 2020 is still not available for sale in Victoria and New South Wales in order to "comply with local laws and regulations".

China 
In Mainland China, there were moral panics by media similar to those involving airsoft, triggering a joint meeting from the Chinese authority in 2018 to "crackdown and regulate illegal activities/crimes involving guns and explosive items".  In September 2020, the Deputy Minister of Public Security, Lin Rui, announced on a video conference of "nationwide special action on crackdown and regulation of online-purchased criminal/illegal imitation guns" (全国打击整治网售仿真枪违法犯罪专项行动) that the Ministry of Public Security, Office of the Central Cyberspace Affairs, General Administration of Customs, State Administration for Market Regulation, State Post Bureau and other local authorities will be jointly working to inspect and confiscate any toy guns, gel blasters and other replica/imitation guns that violate the regulation standards, clamping down on the manufacturing, sale and trafficking, and encouraging the public to report in offenders.  Although more details are yet to come out, many in China have seen this as the official banning of gel blasters. Most toy gun manufacturers and retailers have since switched to foam dart guns and non-shooting, shell-ejecting prop guns.

See also 
Airgun
Airsoft gun
Laser Tag
Nerf
Paintball gun

References

Toy weapons
Pneumatic weapons